North River Mills Historic District is a national historic district located at North River Mills, Hampshire County, West Virginia.  The district encompasses 25 contributing buildings and five contributing sites. The district lies along Hiett Run, which
empties into the North River, a tributary of the Cacapon River.  It has become an industrial ghost town, now visited only by summer residents and tourists.  The contributing buildings include the Hiett House (c. 1770) with shed and privy; Croston House (c. 1840) and barn (c. 1910); North River Mills Grocery (c. 1810, c. 1920); Shanholtz House (c. 1930), also known as North River Mills Society for Antiquarian Arts and the Diffusion of Knowledge; North River Mills School (c. 1880); Miller House (c. 1790) and associated outbuildings; United Methodist Church (c. 1893); Kump House (c. 1805); and the Moreland House (c. 1880).  Contributing sites are the cemetery associated with the Kump House, Miller Mill Site (c. 1880), Shanholtz Mill Site (c. 1930), mill pond (c. 1880), and millrace (c. 1880).

It was listed on the National Register of Historic Places in 2011.

Gallery

See also
List of historic sites in Hampshire County, West Virginia
National Register of Historic Places listings in Hampshire County, West Virginia

References

External links

North River Mills Society for Antiquarian Arts and the Diffusion of Knowledge website

Bungalow architecture in West Virginia
Commercial buildings on the National Register of Historic Places in West Virginia
Federal architecture in West Virginia
Georgian architecture in West Virginia
Gothic Revival architecture in West Virginia
Historic districts in Hampshire County, West Virginia
Houses on the National Register of Historic Places in West Virginia
National Register of Historic Places in Hampshire County, West Virginia
Vernacular architecture in West Virginia
1770 establishments in Virginia
Houses in Hampshire County, West Virginia
Historic districts on the National Register of Historic Places in West Virginia